The Japanese manga series Nana, written and illustrated by Ai Yazawa, features a cast of fictional characters of which the two main characters share the name Nana. The series chronicles their friendship and their lives as each chases her dreams. Nana Komatsu is a small town girl who goes to Tokyo to follow her boyfriend and college friends, with the hope of having her dream life. Nana Oosaki was in a popular punk band in her home town. Nana Oosaki's friends include her bandmates in the Black Stones (Blast) and her former bandmate who is involved in a band called Trapnest.

Main characters

Nana Osaki

Nana Osaki is a 20-year-old woman who moves to Tokyo to pursue a professional music career with her band, Black Stones, of which she is the main vocalist. From a young age, Nana O. was abandoned by her mother and never knew her biological father, leading her to grow up with her grandmother. Throughout high school, Nana O. was also a loner and feared by her classmates until Nobu befriends her. She was expelled from high school after she was falsely accused of prostitution. Nana K. views her as stylish, beautiful, and reliable; however, Nana O. fears losing the people around her.
Nana O. initially dates Ren after being introduced through Nobu, and they all played in the band Black Stones with Yasu. However, they break up after Ren is recruited to be in Trapnest, as Nana O. stubbornly refuses to allow his fame to be the reason for her success. After moving to Tokyo, Nana O. resumes her relationship with Ren, but she continues to resent Trapnest for causing him to leave Black Stones in the first place, as well as Nana K. eventually choosing Takumi, a Trapnest member, over Nobu. Nana K. leaving her motivates her to make Black Stones successful at any cost to win her back. However, this also causes her to develop a panic disorder, which continues to worsen.
In the present timeline, Nana O. has cut contact with everyone and has fled to England, with Nana K. and the others searching for her.

Nana Komatsu

Nana Komatsu is a 20-year-old woman who moves to Tokyo to join her friends and her boyfriend, Shoji. She has a penchant for falling in love easily, and when she was in her third year of high school, she was in an extramarital relationship with Asano before Asano ended their relationship. Due to her kindness and faithfulness, Nana O. nicknames her , after the dog Hachikō. Wildly imaginative, Nana K. often blames her misfortunes on the "demon lord."
After breaking up with Shoji, Nana K. becomes involved in an on-and-off relationship with Takumi, while falling in love with Nobu at the same time. Once Nana K. becomes pregnant, despite not knowing who was the father, she chooses to be with Takumi, as he was readily able to support her financially. After moving and becoming engaged to him, she becomes afraid of facing Nana O. and Nobu, believing that she has betrayed their trust. After reconciling with them, Nana K. is told by Nobu to stay with Nana O. to emotionally support her.
In the present timeline, Nana K. has two children, Ren and Satsuki, with Takumi. She lives with Satsuki in Japan, in hopes of Nana O. returning to the apartment they shared.

Black Stones
Ren was once a member of the group, but, after his departure to join Trapnest, they recruit a new member, Shin. They attract a large following, and ultimately sign a deal with Gaia Records.

Nobuo Terashima

Nicknamed , he is the guitarist of Black Stones and Nana O.'s best friend from high school. After befriending Nana O. during their second year of high school over punk music, Nobu introduces her to Ren, his friend from junior high school, and Yasu, where they formed Black Stones and performed until Ren was recruited to join Trapnest. Bright and friendly, unlike the rest of Black Stones, Nobu does not smoke and has a low alcohol tolerance. He also hails from a wealthy family who owns a Japanese-style inn and disowns him when he pursues a music career.
Nobu idealizes women to a fault, but he slowly realizes he is in love with Nana K. After affirming his love for her, the two date until Nana K. becomes pregnant. Despite suspecting that the child belongs to him, Nana K. chooses to be with Takumi. While Nobu still loves her, he sets aside his feelings to allow her to make her choice. When Black Stones move to a dormitory following preparations for their major label debut, Nobu begins dating Yuri while still being in love with Nana K. However, he promises to teach her child how to play the guitar.
In the present timeline, Nobu and Nana K. have gotten closer, and while they still hold feelings for one another, they are not in a relationship.

Shinichi Okazaki

Nicknamed , he is Black Stones' 15-year-old bassist. He initially lies that his age is 18 years old, but Black Stones let him stay even after finding out the truth. He is mature for his age and acts as a confidant to Nobu, while he views Nana K. as a mother figure. Because he was born and raised in Sweden, Shin is not familiar with some Japanese words and customs.
As a child, Shin was born out of an affair. His mother committed suicide, while his mother's husband adopted him yet refused to acknowledge him as his son. After Shin moves to Japan, he meets Ryoko Kashiwagi, a flight attendant who introduces him to drugs, alcohol, and sex. This leads to Shin moonlighting as a prostitute, with Reira becoming one of his clients. The two fall in love with each other until Reira ends their relationship out of fear of scandal. Following their break-up, Shin returns to Ryoko and gets arrested when the police find marijuana in her apartment, which causes Black Stones to withdraw from their first tour and Shin to be on probation for one month. After sorting out his feelings, Shin realizes that he is not mature enough to support Reira and promises to return to her once he is older and stable. However, after realizing how much Reira depends on Takumi, he decides to give up on her. In the present timeline, Shin is an actor but has yet to reconcile with Reira.

Yasushi Takagi

Nicknamed , he is the drummer of Black Stones. Outside of the band, he is a trainee lawyer. Acting as the band's leader, he handles business partnerships and financial decisions needed for the band's success. Due to his maturity, he acts as an older brother figure to Black Stones.
Yasu grew up in the same orphanage as Ren before being adopted by a wealthy family and attended the same high school with him, as well as Takumi and Reira. He dated Reira for two years during that time, but they eventually broke up after he realized he could never help her get over her feelings for Takumi. After meeting Nana O., he falls in love with her, but he never pursues her out of respect for Ren. When Black Stones prepares for their major label debut, he meets Miu and eventually gets into a relationship with her.
In the present timeline, Yasu remains close with Nana K. and the others, acting as a father figure for Satsuki, the daughter of Nana K. and Takumi.

Trapnest
Due to their popularity, Nana O. sees them as her rival and wants Black Stones to overtake them in Japan. In the present timeline, Trapnest has disbanded.

Ren Honjo

Ren is Trapnest's guitarist, performing under the stage name . Prior to being recruited, he was Black Stones' original bassist, as well as Nana O.'s boyfriend. From a young age, Ren grew up at an orphanage with Yasu and found school boring, opting to practice his guitar alone. He is a fan of the Sex Pistols, particularly Sid Vicious.
Ren is deeply in love with Nana O., but the two initially break up when Ren leaves for Tokyo to join Trapnest, as Nana O. felt that his success would cheapen her own fame. The two get back together; however, Ren begins feeling that he and Nana O. have been growing distant, especially when Black Stones begins to become famous, which causes him to resort to cocaine and marijuana to cope. Even after Ren proposes to Nana O., eventually his drug addiction and Nana O.'s jealousy towards Trapnest worsen and he insists to Takumi and Reira that he wants to quit Trapnest. Once Ren and Nana O. have a falling out, he dies in a car accident, partially from drug overdose, on the way to visit her the night before her 21st birthday.

Reira Serizawa

Reira is Trapnest's 22-year-old vocalist and lyricist. She has been friends and in love with Takumi since childhood, but she is frustrated that he sees her nothing more than a muse and the face of Trapnest. She dated Yasu for two years in high school and becomes one of Shin's clients to sate her loneliness.
Following a scandal where Reira was photographed with Ren, she ends her relationship with Shin to protect Trapnest. After they break-up, Reira attempts to pursue Takumi aggressively, after realizing he will never love her romantically, she decides to continue singing for herself rather than for him. At the same time, Reira comes to understand that while she can never give up her feelings for Takumi, Shin also remains important to her. In the present timeline, she has yet to reconcile with Shin and has given up singing, only being able to do so when Nana K. and Takumi's son, Ren, plays the guitar.
While her name is often romanized as "Reira," she reveals that her real name is Layla, having been named after the song by Eric Clapton. However, her label forces her to hide her half-American background.

Takumi Ichinose

Takumi is Trapnest's 23-year-old leader and bassist, performing under the stage name . Handsome and somewhat of a playboy, Takumi is a workaholic and dedicated to cultivating Trapnest's image, particularly Reira. As a child, he grew up with only the company of Reira, as his mother died, his father was alcoholic, and his older sister had married due to a pregnancy. Takumi finds value in Reira's singing voice, to her dismay. While he acknowledges Reira is in love with him, he views her as a sister, though Nana K. suspects that his feelings may be deeper.
Takumi is Nana K.'s favorite member in Trapnest, and the two begin having an on-again, off-again relationship. Despite Takumi cheating and generally being uninterested in serious relationships, he grows fond of her and begins to show possessive tendencies towards her, especially after she breaks up with him to be with Nobu. Once Nana K. becomes pregnant and becomes unsure of who the father is, Takumi offers to provide for her and the child regardless. In the present timeline, Takumi lives in London with his and Nana K.'s son, Ren.

Naoki Fujieda
 a.k.a. 

Played by: Momosuke Mizutani
Naoki is the drummer of Trapnest. Like Nobu in Black Stones, he is the "clueless", loud-mouthed member of his band. As with the rest of his bandmates, he is a friend of Yasu. His musical interest was awakened by Takumi during middle school. He hoped attract attention from girls by playing in the band. He was the playboy of the band, tricking groupies to fund their cause, to which end is not explained. It is shown that in the future he has a daughter named Momo as he refers to her in conversation with Takumi. It is unknown who the mother or how old she is.

Supporting characters
People who have interacted with Nana K. personally at given times of her life. They do not address her with her nickname, Hachi, and have deeply affected her perceptions on certain situations. As they are not deeply involved with the two bands, she will often reflect on her experiences with them for reassurance when she is in doubt of her simultaneous loyalties to Blast and Trapnest.

Played by: Anna Nose
Junko is Hachi's sensible and no-nonsense best friend. She is much more emotionally mature than Hachi and often pushes her to be more independent and responsible. She works part-time at Jackson's, and is the host of the omake (bonus) section at the end of each manga volume, reading fan mail and displaying fan art. She is often called "Jun" by Hachi.

Played by: Takehisa Takayama
Kyousuke is Junko's boyfriend who currently shares an apartment with her. He is also good friends with Hachi and Shouji. His laid-back attitude to life may deem him a slacker in the eyes of many, but he is actually quite perceptive and he coddles Hachi more than Junko would like. Both he and Junko are studying to become artists (his art being Romantic and hers being Post-Modernistic). Although Shouji has said several times that he used to be a player, Kyousuke says very seriously that he would never cheat on Junko because he is afraid of losing her. He also says that he liked Junko the moment he saw her.

Played by: Yuta Hiraoka
Shouji is Hachi's ex-boyfriend. He is a struggling art student and works as a waiter. He met Hachi through his old friend, Junko, and Hachi originally moved to Tokyo to be closer to him. However, their relationship gradually cooled and he cheated on her with Sachiko, a co-worker and classmate. Even though he still has feelings for Hachi, he leaves her for Sachiko. Junko later guesses that Shouji felt rejected by Hachi when she refused to fight for him, and that the real reason he chose Sachiko was because she openly showed her love for him. This is opposed to Hachi who was so "one-way" and made Shouji feel as though she only loved him because he loved her. They meet by chance some time later at Jackson Hole and talk for the first time since breaking up. They speak casually, and Hachi admits that she thought that after the drama of him cheating on her died down that they would be friends again. When they part, Shouji tells her that he now realizes that what she was asking for was not really too much, and that he had fun talking to her. Because of this, he says sadly that would not see her again. They part in tears, and Shouji meets up with Sachiko to look at fireworks. He tells her that he can only see things clearly from far away and that the closer things are, the more he loses sight of them. She assures him that that is the same for everyone and they hold hands while watching the fireworks.

Played by: Saeko
Sachiko is Shouji's restaurant coworker who becomes his girlfriend. Early on in the manga, Hachi dreamed of Shouji two-timing her with a buxom, Prada-loving city girl named Sachiko (she thought of the name randomly), although Kawamura is different in appearance, being petite. She confesses to Shouji and he moves in with her later.

Nami is Hachi's younger sister and the youngest in the Komatsu household. She has the appearance of a ganguro girl because of her suntan and bleached hair. Nami is very outgoing and loud who is also a Trapnest fan.

Nao is Hachi's older sister who looks quite a bit like Natsuko. Even though Nao is married, she still lives near the Komatsu family home.

Natsuko is Hachi's mother. Kind and understanding, she is a model mother to her daughters, and Nana Osaki considers Natsuko to be cool.  Hachi, however finds it weird since she thought that her family is nothing but "normal".

Satsuki is the daughter of Takumi Ichinose & Nana Komatsu. Not much known about her, and she makes only a few appearances later in the series. When she appears, she is six years old (presumably showing the future outlook of the story) and well-loved by her mother's friends. It is not known if she is truly Takumi's or Nobu's child, but she bears a striking resemblance to Takumi, as she has his black hair and hazel eyes. She is revealed to have a crush on Shin, though his reciprocation (or even his knowledge of her feelings) is unlikely. During her pregnancy, Hachi and Takumi unofficially called her "Sachiko". Her name, Satsuki, was chosen by Ren at the request of Hachi, who was unable to think up any name other than "Sachiko". It is implied that Ren may be seen as her older brother as once her mother had asked whether she would give her Valentine chocolates to "older brother". She currently lives in Japan with Nana while Takumi and Ren live in London.

Ren is a morose young boy initially seen in the company of Reira during the segments depicting the future. He is depicted as being close to Takumi, who is assumed to be his father. He is currently living in London with Takumi and he doesn't want to return to Japan. In the future, Reira apparently has given up singing, but will sing when Ren plays the guitar for her.

Hachi's first lover. A handsome, older, married man, Asano carried on a secret affair with Hachi that ended when he was abruptly transferred to Tokyo. Though Hachi believed that she was in love with him, she was convinced that he saw her as just an easy girl to play around with. When Hachi encounters him again in Tokyo, later, it is implied that he actually had serious feelings for her, but never told her because of her insistence in describing their affair as a mere "fling". After resolving her own personal issues with him, tells him to stop cheating on his wife.

Music industry characters

Gaia Records
Black Stones eventually sign a full contract with Gaia Records. Due to the tabloids' interest over Nana and Ren's relationship, Blast members relocated to one of Gaia's facilities and voluntarily shared housing with other talented individuals under Gaia's name.

The leader of the corporation which owns Gaia Records.

 a.k.a. 

Blast's manager. He talks in a very feminine way (unless angered), is openly gay, and he has a questionable interest in Yasu. In Nana's eyes, Ginpei is the second "baldy" related to Blast—the first being Yasu.

 / 

An ardent fan of Blast since its inception, Misato loves Nana and has befriended the band. However, "Uehara Misato" is not her true name. Mai claims that a fortune teller told her that if she used the name "Uehara Misato" she could become closer to Nana, but may have actually chosen it because it is the name of Nana's half-sister. She later joins the staff at Gaia, Blast's record label. She came to know about Nana and Blast when she read her grandfather's diary and discovered that he and Nana's grandmother were once lovers. Recent chapters reveal that Mai may actually have a secret she prefers not to reveal since the tabloids have discovered Nana's father's surname may actually be "Tsuzuki", which would imply that she, like Uehara Misato, is Nana's half-sister.

 a.k.a. 

A placid and soft-spoken actress who shares a boarding house with Blast and Yuri. She is older than she looks (27) and her name is often mispronounced "Myuu" by Nobu. Miu wears long sleeves to hide the scars on her wrists from self-mutilation. Also, in volume 11 (the volume where she first appears), it is shown that she is a very good mahjong player (she claimed that she learnt her skills by having special training for her role in a mahjong movie as a nameless rival).  Miu was first introduced to Nobu during Nana's first hyperventilation attack, when she lends Nobu a paper bag to help Nana deal with it. After a few more confrontations with Nobu, they become fast friends, and he is immediately smitten by her. However when he makes a move on her, she reveals her age and indirectly rejects him for being "unreliable." She eventually begins dating Yasu, although it is implied that their relationship was built out of convenience - Yasu to give Nana independence and Miu because she thought Yasu was stable. However, Miu expresses jealousy towards women that Yasu appears to have strong emotional relationships with, particularly Nana and Shion, which Yasu becomes aware of. Although she was initially reluctant to have sex with Yasu, she gives in, feeling pressure that Nana might snatch him away.
Despite Miu's apparent aloofness, she is sincere and perceptive enough to predict what Yasu will do. She quickly befriends Hachi and Nana notes upon meeting Miu for the first time that Miu and Hachi got along well.  Because of her close friendship with Hachi, Miu reveals to her that she would stop cutting herself because she did not want to upset Yasu. In the future, it is seen that Miu and Yasu remain together and she has cut her long hair. Her long standing friendship with Hachi is still evident.

 / 

A giggly, giddy AV idol (porn star) who shares a boarding house with Blast and Miu and tends to speak crudely. Her real name is Asami Matsumoto. Yuri was a teenage runaway before she starred in adult videos, and she has financial problems due to her sleazy manager and her own fickle nature. She has a large advance to pay off, but is pressured by her manager into continuing adult films when Yuri has nearly paid off the debt when he promises that her new contract will allow her to star in a movie adaptation of a popular novel. Nobu begins dating her after he is rejected by Miu. However, because Nobu still has feelings for Nana Komatsu, Yuri dislikes and is jealous of Hachi, whom Yuri refers to as "Takumi's wife". Her relationship with Nobu becomes increasingly strained when she expresses her frustration towards Hachi with insensitive remarks towards both Nana and Hachi after Ren's death.

The security guard who guards the hostel where Blast stays in. He has the look of a gangster, and frequently sleeps at his post.

One of Gaia's recording producers and the first to scout for Blast in Tokyo. He does not know much about punk or rock but is thoroughly impressed with the band's charm and Nana's charisma. He is kind-hearted and fully believes in Blast's success despite skepticism from executives and his peers. Though high enough in the company to have influence, he was unaware of Gaia's leak to the scandal surrounding Nana. Originally, he declined to sign Blast an official contract as the pay Gaia was willing to compensate for each member would have been less than they deserved. Yasu, however, privately convinced him that dreams were more important and he sealed the deal.

President of Blast's Private Fan Club and a long-time fan of Yasu since his days in Brute. She keeps in contact with Mai and divides the fans by their interests in the members. Her devotion to Yasu is unfailing and she relays any news outside of Gaia's influence to him. When questioned about her financial situation, she replied to have some dependency from her rich "father"—though he is not biological. First seen in the story as a bobcut-haired groupie, later as a platinum blonde during her late teens, and re-introduced with curled black hair as an adult; Shion's only constant traits include the mole underneath her left eye and the tattoo on her right arm.

Cookie Music
Trapnest's official record label which is also a homage to the magazine that serialized the manga. Unlike Blast, members are assigned more managers who ensure that they meet their appointments and affirm each member's status.

The head of Cookie Music, Narita is flamboyant, but reasonably talented with music. He works frequently with Takumi when it comes to Trapnest's music and marketing strategies. Narita also provides Ren with drugs (a powder which Takumi later identifies as heroin). In exchange, Ren must continue to write hit songs. It is implied that Narita introduced Ren to heroin but later regretted this after Ren had become addicted.

Trapnest's director. He is easily moved by tales of romanticism and love. Though he is supposed to direct during recordings, he usually sets appointments or sends requests to the president of the company, leaving all artistic direction in Takumi's hands.

One of Trapnest's assistants. Occasionally, he will check on Ren and take him to recordings. He loves the quality of Ren's cars.

Reira's personal assistant and manager. She is intelligent and has experience as a student at a law university.

 a.k.a. 
Assistant in charge of Trapnest's publicity. Out of the assistants mentioned so far, he is the one that Takumi trusts the most. Members of the band often address him as "Take".

Search Magazine
A magazine that shares similar characteristics to the Japanese magazine, Friday. They are a part of the "paparazzi" that track both bands. When Blast was becoming popular, they were given a leak that connected Nana O with Ren and have not stopped from spreading negative (and sometimes false) information about them.

The editor in charge of the tabloids surrounding Blast and Trapnest. According to Arai, he is supposed to answer to a higher supervisor, Yokoyama, but he chooses to be more impetuous in his actions. He employs Miyake and Kurada to investigate in his place.

Search magazine's editor-in-chief. He has already been married for two years. He is often the one to chide Kudou for his brash methods of investigations.

Photographer hired by Search magazine to track Nana O. and Ren. He has conflicting opinions with his employer, Kudou, and claims that once he sees a face, he will never forget it. Curiously, after investigating Nana at a later unspecified time, he reports that "Nana died at that sea". The depth of these words have yet to be explained.

Kurada's partner in crime who frequently stalks Nana O. for a private interview. Yasu punched him on one occasion, which later lead to a negative article about Yasu being published in their magazine. He finds nothing wrong about pestering the couple, thinking that their relationship is fragile to begin with.

The only woman in the editorial group. She does scold her peers for their cruelty, but also finds their harassments of Nana O and Ren as testing their love for one another.

Other characters

Owner to a cheap vintage furniture and clothing store near both Nana's apartment in Tokyo. He hired Hachi but soon closed the store to move back home. He later sends her a postcard with a wedding photo with him and his bride (a childhood friend), ironic to Hachi's lament at the time.

A 38-year-old woman who is Hachi's boss at her new job at the magazine production industry. She is crude and scornful, and will not hesitate to throw insults at all sorts of minor imperfections that Hachi has made.

A waiter at the Jackson's Burger restaurant. He is friendly with Hachi, Junko, and Shouji, who all curiously address him by his full name.

 Nana Oosaki's maternal grandmother, the owner of a small shop who adopted and raised Nana after she was abandoned by her mother. Nana and Miyuki's relationship did not seem particularly good and she was hard on Nana, though Miyuki's relationship with her own daughter did not seem to be much better. Miyuki dies shortly after Nana is kicked out of high school after she does not refute the false accusations of prostitution; Nana believes that her grandmother died of grief and would have fought against the charges if she had known that her grandmother would have lived.

Nana Oosaki's half-sister who appears before Nana at a special "thank you" concert for Blast's fans. She lives in Osaka, her parents own an okonomiyaki shop. She is also known as "Misato Number Two" by Nana. Though she bears a striking similarity to her, she is unaware of her true relationship with Nana and ironically became one of her newer devoted fans. Mai has said that it is not a good idea for Nana and Misato to become too close because they share the same mother, who abandoned Nana O to her grandmother when Nana was just a child. When her mother's relationship to Nana is revealed, Misato's house is bombarded with paparazzi and Misato's mother disappears. Misato, stricken with the revelation, winds up running away to Tokyo and wandering for two days until she is found by Shion.  Eventually, her mother takes responsibility to find Misato and bring her home.

 Nana Oosaki and Misato Uehara's mother. Shortly after the real Misato's appearance, Nana's mother is revealed to be living a life as a housewife and she refuses to acknowledge any connection with Nana.  In response to learning who her mother is, Nana shows little emotional reaction, being only mildly disappointed at how ordinary her mother is, and still apparently unaware that the real Misato Uehara is her half-sister.  When her relationship to Nana Oosaki is publicly exposed, Misuzu flees from her family in Osaka, leaving them to the paparazzi. When Kurada tracks her down and implies that Misato is in danger after running away to Tokyo, Misuzu reluctantly reveals that she abandoned Nana because she wanted to be with a man who hated children. Afterward, she attempts to have her stepson bring Misato home and is forced to do so herself when he refuses because he wants her to take responsibility for her actions.

 Misato Uehara's older half-brother from her father's previous marriage; as a result, he is not a blood relative of Nana Oosaki. He is mostly uninterested in Nana or her music, but becomes involved when his family become a target of paparazzi as a result of his stepmother's relationship to the singer. He and his family take refuge with relatives in Okayama, but he becomes increasingly worried for his sister when she runs away to Tokyo until he learns of her whereabouts through his girlfriend, who is contacted by Shion because she happens to be a fan of Yasu. When Misuzu attempts to have him bring Misato home, he refuses because he knows Misato will not willingly return with him and because he wants Misuzu to take responsibility for her actions. He later becomes engaged to Kayoko.

 The grandfather of Mai Tsuzuki. Mai learned through her grandfather's diaries that he and Miyuki Oosaki may have been lovers, which suggests the possibility that she and Nana are somehow related by blood, though even Mai appears to be uncertain. Through her grandfather's diaries, Mai became acquainted with who Nana was, and eventually became one of Nana's earliest fans.

She is the real Misato's friend, a fan of Blast and Shin in particular. She was among the trio selected to represent Kansai at Blast's special fan gathering.

Ryoko is a flight attendant who took in Shin to live with her shortly after he moved to Japan, after which she introduced him to drugs, sex, and alcohol. She bears a slight resemblance to Reira. After Shin and Reira break up, he returns to her until they are both arrested for marijuana possession. She remains in custody of the police after they also find out she had been running a sex trafficking ring for underage boys.

 The second generation guitarist for Trapnest and Ren's predecessor. He only appears in flashbacks, though is mentioned in a conversation between Takumi and Ren when they are reminiscing about Trapnest's past.  Atsushi eventually quit the band after getting punched by Takumi after getting into too many disagreements with him, mostly because Atsushi was tired of following Takumi's vision without question or compromise.  At the time, Naoki was upset that they had lost another guitarist and felt as though Atsushi had abandoned them, though he eventually gets over it.

Works cited
 "Ch." is shortened form for chapter and refers to a chapter number of the Nana manga.
 "Ep." is shortened form for episode and refers to an episode number of the Nana anime.
 LA refers to one of the live-action Nana films.

References

Nana